Get Some Go Again (stylized as Get Some -> Go Again) is the sixth studio album by Rollins Band, released in 2000. It is also the first album by lead singer Henry Rollins after dissolving his longtime lineup featuring guitarist Chris Haskett and others. On this album, and its follow-up Nice, Rollins was backed by the band Mother Superior.

Production
Henry Rollins came into contact with Mother Superior at the beginning of 1998, when they asked him to produce songs for their upcoming album Deep.  After the collaboration, Rollins asked Mother Superior to return the favor and write songs with him. They booked rehearsal time in the same studio where Rollins had first practiced with Black Flag. Rollins and Mother Superior wrote three songs that night, with Rollins saying that they were "exactly the kind of music that I had always wanted to make."

Later in 1998, Rollins and the new lineup played a handful of shows together in the United States. The name "Rollins Band" was retained under the insistence of management, rather than Rollins himself. The last concert Rollins had played with the old lineup was on October 17, 1997 in Osaka, Japan, with guitarist Chris Haskett only finding out he wasn't in the band anymore through the internet in 1998, where he had read that Rollins Band were playing shows again.

Afterwards, recording for the next Rollins Band album commenced. In July 1999, Rollins Band went on a small eight show tour of the United States, where they previewed some of the new songs. Regarding the album, Rollins stated, "I'm very happy with Get Some, Go Again. I like the sounds, the playing, the takes, the soul and the passion, and feel that I have given it everything I've got. I'm very proud of the record." In a 2000 interview with the Tampa Bay Times, he also said, "I don't feel like a young person anymore. I listen to the lyrics of the fella from Limp Bizkit and I remember that angst. But I no longer have that. That's a young man's angst."

Release
The album has been released with extra tracks and/or several slight variations in different territories, and was also released as an Enhanced CD with multimedia tracks, including videos in QuickTime format. Due to a manufacturing error, copies pressed and released for sale in the United States omitted the song "Illuminator", a remix of the first song on the album, "Illumination". In 2000 the album's publisher, DreamWorks Records, issued a statement to fans saying that those who purchased the defective discs could write the company and received a special promotional CD with the missing track, as well as a copy of the bonus enhanced CD.

When Rollins left DreamWorks in 2001, he took possession of the master tapes and reissued both this album's tracks, including the missing "Illuminator" remix, along with the tracks on the companion album Yellow Blues, on the double CD Get Some Go Again Sessions.

Reception

Upon release, critics noted its more basic sound compared to prior albums. AllMusic's Chris True labelled the album an "infectious blend of acid rock, metal, and punk", claiming that "with 1997's Come In and Burn, everyone (including Henry Rollins himself) knew that the Rollins Band lineup of Sim Cain, Melvin Gibbs, and Chris Haskett had reached an impasse. While the band was entering into new territory, featuring acoustic and jazz work, Rollins was stomping down the same path he had since his days in the Washington, D.C., hardcore scene." He further adds that the new stripped down sound "seems to have reinvigorated Rollins himself, who sounds like he's actually having fun on this record." In 2022, Louder Sound placed it sixth on their ranking of the seven Rollins Band studio albums, similarly remarking that, "after the deep introspection of Come In and Burn, Get Some is the sound of a rejuvenated Henry Rollins having fun."

In 2021, Alternative Press included it on their list of the "Best Punk albums of 2000", reflecting, "[in the 1990s] Rollins Band became an alt-metal powerhouse, dominating MTV with 'Low Self Opinion' and 'Liar'. Their sixth album found the entire band replaced by Los Angeles hard rockers Mother Superior. Get Some Go Again was perhaps more straightforward than such LPs as Weight, possibly slightly less funky and jazzy, like hearing Rollins sing atop Jimi Hendrix and Black Sabbath outtakes. Not necessarily a bad thing."

Track listing
All songs written by Rollins Band (Henry Rollins, Jim Wilson, Marcus Blake and Jason Mackenroth) except as noted.

"Illumination" – 4:11
"Get Some Go Again" – 2:12
"Monster" – 3:03
"Love's So Heavy" – 3:53
"Thinking Cap" – 4:11
"Change It Up" – 3:03
"I Go Day Glo" – 1:45
"Are You Ready?" (Brian Downey, Scott Gorham, Phil Lynott, Brian Robertson) – 2:43
"On the Day" – 3:44
"You Let Yourself Down" – 2:46
"Brother Interior" – 5:39
"Hotter and Hotter" (Rollins, Wilson, Blake, Mackenroth, Wayne Kramer) – 3:50
"L.A. Money Train" – 14:13

Personnel
Rollins Band
Henry Rollins – vocals
Jason Mackenroth – drums, saxophone
Marcus Blake – bass
Jim Wilson – guitar, piano
with:
Scott Gorham – second guitar on "Are You Ready?"
Wayne Kramer – guitar on "Hotter and Hotter" and "L.A. Money Train"
Technical
Clif Norrell – recording, mixing
George Marino – mastering

Charts

References

External links
 Info on various versions of Get Some Go Again

Rollins Band albums
2000 albums
DreamWorks Records albums